Jesús Giles Sánchez (9 June 1961 – 15 April 2012) was a Mexican politician from the National Action Party. From 2009 to 2012 he served as Deputy of the LXI Legislature of the Mexican Congress representing Morelos. He also was Mayor of Cuernavaca from 2006 to 2009

Giles died on 15 April 2012 due to cancer.

References

1961 births
2012 deaths
People from Cuernavaca
Politicians from Morelos
Academic staff of Universidad Autónoma del Estado de Morelos
Members of the Congress of Morelos
Municipal presidents in Morelos
National Action Party (Mexico) politicians
Deaths from cancer in Mexico
21st-century Mexican politicians
Members of the Chamber of Deputies (Mexico) for Morelos